"The Lonely Herdsman" is an episode of the BBC sitcom, The Green Green Grass. It was first screened on 9 November 2007, as the second episode of series three.

Synopsis

When Marlene drags Boycie and Tyler to visit her mother Dora, the battle lines are drawn. Spending the day away from the farm gives the staff freedom – well, more than they usually have to sit around doing almost nothing. The only exceptions being Bryan trying his hand at poetry to stop him feeling lonely and Mrs Cakeworthy surfing the net to help him find a solution.

Episode cast

References

British TV Comedy Guide for The Green Green Grass
BARB viewing figures

2007 British television episodes
The Green Green Grass episodes